Sakina Zahra Sheikh (born 1990) is a British Labour Party politician who has been a Member of the London Assembly (AM) for Londonwide  since 2021. She also represents Perry Vale on Lewisham Council.

Early life and education
Sheikh studied Law with an emphasis on Human Rights.

Political career 
Sheikh was first elected to Lewisham Council in 2018 as a councillor for Perry Vale ward. She was re-elected in 2022.

In 2020, she ran for selection as a Labour candidate in the London Assembly list, which covers the entire city. Her campaign emphasised social housing, acting on the climate crisis, and equalities. She won second place on Labour's list of list candidates, and was elected as the second of Labour's two Londonwide Assembly Members in the 2021 London election.

Since her election, she has continued to focus on the climate and is chair of the 2022-2023 Planning and Regeneration committee.

References 

Living people
21st-century British women politicians
Councillors in the London Borough of Lewisham
Labour Members of the London Assembly
1990 births
British politicians of Pakistani descent
People from Lambeth
Women councillors in England